The 1994 Tipperary Senior Hurling Championship was the 104th staging of the Tipperary Senior Hurling Championship since its establishment by the Tipperary County Board in 1887. The championship began on 27 August 1994 and ended on 2 October 1994.

Toomevara were the defending champions.

On 2 October 1994, Toomevara won the championship after a 3-11 to 1-09 defeat of Cashel King Cormacs in the final at Semple Stadium. It was their 13th championship title overall and their third title in succession.

Qualification

Results

Quarter-finals

Semi-finals

Final

Championship statistics

Top scorers

Top scorers overall

Top scorers in a single game

References

External links

 The Nenagh Co-op 1994 County Senior Hurling Championship

Tipperary
Tipperary Senior Hurling Championship
1994 in Irish sport